Ulittaniujalik National Park is a  national park, created on 10 March, 2016, in Nunavik, Quebec, Canada. It was created in partnership with the Inuit communities of Kangiqsualujjuaq and Kuujjuaq, in addition to the Naskapi community of Kawawachikamach.

Flora and fauna

The landscapes vary greatly. In the George River valley, there are forests of spruce and larch, and even birch and balsam poplar, which are usually present at lower latitudes. The park protects the George River caribou herd, whose population has dramatically decreased over recent decades.

References

IUCN Category II
National parks of Quebec
Protected areas of Nord-du-Québec
Protected areas established in 2016
2016 establishments in Quebec